Edward Kpodo (born January 14, 1990) is a Ghanaian football defender who plays for Berekum Chelsea.

Career
In February 2013, Kpodo moved to FC Khimki on loan from Berekum Chelsea F.C., signing permanently for fellow Russian Football League side FC Shinnik Yaroslavl on a one-year contract in July 2013. A year layer Kpodo moved to the Armenian Premier League with Ulisses FC. After a year with Ulisses, Kpodo returned to Ghana with Berekum Chelsea in June 2015, but did not feature for the club as they failed to receive his International Transfer Certificate from Ulisses until December 2015. In February 2016, Kpodo moved back to Armenia, signing a one-year contract with Gandzasar Kapan.
On 6 December 2019, Kpodo signed a new contracts with FC Urartu. On 4 July 2020, Urartu announced that Kpodo had left the club after his contract was terminated by mutual consent.

Career statistics

Honours
Berekum Chelsea
Ghanaian Premier League (1): 2010–11

References

External links
 

1990 births
Living people
Ghanaian footballers
Ghanaian expatriate footballers
Expatriate footballers in Russia
Expatriate footballers in Armenia
Ghanaian expatriate sportspeople in Russia
FC Khimki players
FC Shinnik Yaroslavl players
FC Shirak players
FC Urartu players
Armenian Premier League players
Russian First League players
African Games gold medalists for Ghana
African Games medalists in football
Association football defenders
Competitors at the 2011 All-Africa Games